Palacode taluk is a taluk in the Dharmapuri district of the Indian state of Tamil Nadu. The headquarters of the taluk is the town of Palacode. Part of Cauvery North Wildlife Sanctuary is located in this taluk.

Geography
Palacode is located on the northwest region of Tamil Nadu in Dharmapuri district with an average elevation of 533 meters 
above MSL. The terrain can be described as rolling in nature. The taluk extends to an area of 73,267 h.a, covering 16% of the district's total area. The various proportional area divisions are:
 Forests - 31.86%
 Barren Lands - 3.17%
 Non Agricultural use -3.4%
 Cultivable Waste Land - 0.35%
 Permanent Cultivated Land and Grassland - 0.90%
 Current Fallow - 1.74%
 Other Fallow Lands - 0.65%
The taluk has reserves ofblack granite.

Demographics
According to the 2011 census, the taluk of Palakkodu had a population of 345,906 with 178,514 males and 167,392 females. There were 938 women for every 1,000 men. The taluk had a literacy rate of 41.04%. Child population in the age group below 6 years were 20,954 Males and 18,600 Females.

Some Important Places

Dharmapuri District Co Operative Sugar Mills Limited 
This is a co-operative sugar mill established in the year 1971-72. The present crushing capacity of the mill is 2000 M.T. A polytechnic college (named Dharmapuri District Co-op. Sugar Mills Polytechnic College) was established in 1985 under the management of the sugar-mill.

Government Polytechnic College 
The college was established by the state government in 2010 in Boomandahalli village and extends to an area of 5 acres. The Government College of Engineering, Dharmapuri is also functioning here temporarily.

Modhur village 
A small village near Dharmapuri has been found to be archaeologically significant as historians have revealed that it has been inhabited since the Neolithic age, about 10,000 years ago.

Historians, who have been studying inscriptions and tools found in the area, are of the opinion that Modhur, situated about fifteen kilo metres from Dharmapuri town, was highly civilised and was most probably the capital for the Athiyaman kingdom. Stone hammers, grinding stones, rubbing stones, stone balls, and a terracotta statue of the mother goddess were excavated in the village.

Nearly 17 varieties of stones tools were used by the people of Modhur that dates back to a period about 10,000 years back. â€œThe Neolithic people who lived here were highly civilised and there is evidence that the people were engaged in agriculture, said S Selvaraj, a retired regional assistant director, department of archaeology.

Modhur is an important historical site, situated about 15 km from Dharmapuri. The antiquity of Modhur village went back to the Neolithic age (about 10,000 years old). It had a succession of habitations. In the surface collection, the site yielded black and red ware, slipped ware and few grey pottery of the Megalithic period (about 3,000 years old). Two hero stone inscriptions of the Hoysala king were also found. More than 20 megalithic burials were found at Tirumalvadi, near Modhur. A Chola period inscription of the 10th century, which was found in the village, indicated that Chola kings had imposed tax for marriages.

Cauvery North Wildlife Sanctuary 
On 12 March 2014, the Government of Tamil Nadu declared Cauvery North Wild Life Sanctuary under clause (b) of sub-section (1) of Section 26-A of the Wild Life (Protection) Act, 1972 in Gazette No.II(2)/EF/254/2014 covering the protected area of Palacode taluk of Dharmapuri forest division and Denkanikottai taluk of Hosur forest division in northern western Tamil Nadu.

List of village panchayats
Reference
 Adilam
 Amanimallapuram
 Annamalai Hally
 Athimutlu
 Baisuhally
 Bandarahalli
 Baragur
 Battalahalli
 Belamaranahalli
 Bellarahalli
 Bevuhalli
 Bikkanahalli golasanahalli
 Bodikuttapalli
 Bolapakutthanahalli
 Bommaandahalli
 Bommahalli
 Booganahalli
 Boppidi
 Budihalli
 Chettihalli
 Chikkadoranabetta
 Chikkamarandahalli
 Chinnagoundanahalli
 Chinnamanahalli
 Elumichanahally
 Erranahalli
 Erraseegalahally
 Erukuttahalli
 Eruthukuttahalli
 Gidanahalli
 Gudlanahalli
 Gujjarahalli
 Gummanur
 Guttalahalli
 Hanumanthapuram
 Indamangalam
 Jakkasamudram
 Jarthalav
 Jittandahally
 Kalappanahalli
 Kanavanahalli
 Kandenahalli
 Karagoor
 Karagathahalli
 Karimangalam
 Karugkamaranahalli
 Karukkanahalli
 Kattanahally
 Keragodahalli
 Kondasamanahalli
 Kottumaranahalli
 Kumbarahally
 Kuravandahalli
 Mahendramangalam
 Mallikuttai
 Marandahalli
 Maravadi
 Modugulahalli
 Molapannahalli
 Mottalur
 Mukkulam
 Murukalnatham
 Murukkampatty
 Naganampatty
 Nallur
 Nammandahalli
 Nariyanahalli
 Nelamaruthahalli
 P.Chettihalli
 P.Gollahalli
 Padi
 Palacode
 Panjapalli
 Pappanaickanpatty
 Patchikanapalli
 Periyanahalli
 Periyanur
 Poonadanahalli
 Pothalahalli
 Pulikallu
 Pulikarai
 Rangampatty
 Salliampatty
 Samanoor
 Sanganpasuvanthalav
 Sekkodi
 Senrayanahalli
 Serandapuram
 Serenahalli
 Sethikanahalli
 Sikkadoranabettam
 Sikkarthanahalli
 Soddanur
 Thandukaranahalli
 Thellanahalli
 Thimarayanahalli
 Thindal
 Thirumalvadi
 Thomalahalli
 Thonenahalli
 Thumbalahalli
 Upparahalli
 Velakalahalli

References

Taluks of Dharmapuri district